Calliostoma gibbsorum is a species of sea snail, a marine gastropod mollusk in the family Calliostomatidae.

Some authors place this taxon in the subgenus Calliostoma (Maurea).

Description

Distribution
This marine species occurs off the Three Kings Islands, New Zealand.

References

 Marshall, 1995. A revision of the recent Calliostoma species of New Zealand (Mollusca:Gastropoda:Trochoidea). The Nautilus 108(4):83-127

gibbsorum
Gastropods described in 1995